Berwick-upon-Tweed Borough Council elections were generally held every four years between the council's creation in 1974 and its abolition in 2009. The Borough of Berwick-upon-Tweed was a non-metropolitan district in Northumberland, England. The council was abolished and its functions transferred to Northumberland County Council with effect from 1 April 2009.

Political control
An earlier municipal borough of Berwick-upon-Tweed had existed from 1836 to 1974, just covering the town itself. Under the Local Government Act 1972 a much larger borough of Berwick-upon-Tweed was created as a non-metropolitan district, including a large rural area as well as the town itself. The first election to the reformed council was held in 1973, initially operating as a shadow authority before coming into its powers on 1 April 1974. From 1973 until its abolition in 2009 political control of the council was held by the following parties:

Council elections
1973 Berwick-upon-Tweed Borough Council election
1976 Berwick-upon-Tweed Borough Council election (New ward boundaries)
1979 Berwick-upon-Tweed Borough Council election
1983 Berwick-upon-Tweed Borough Council election
1987 Berwick-upon-Tweed Borough Council election
1991 Berwick-upon-Tweed Borough Council election
1995 Berwick-upon-Tweed Borough Council election
1999 Berwick-upon-Tweed Borough Council election (New ward boundaries)
2003 Berwick-upon-Tweed Borough Council election
2007 Berwick-upon-Tweed Borough Council election
2008 (New ward boundaries)

Mayoral referendum
A referendum was held on 21 February 2002 on whether to have a directly elected mayor. The proposal was decisively rejected.

Support 3,617 26%

Oppose 10,212 74%

Turnout 64%

By-election results

References

Council elections in Northumberland
History of Berwick-upon-Tweed
District council elections in England